Eeshwar is a 1989 bollywood film written, and directed by K. Vishwanath. The film stars Anil Kapoor, Vijayshanti. It is the Hindi version of Viswanath's Telugu cult classic Swathi Muthyam. The film received the Filmfare Award for Best Story.

Cast

 Anil Kapoor as Ishwarchand Vishnuchand Brahmanand Verma 'Ishwar'
 Vijayshanti as Lalita
 Shammi as Ishwar's grandmother
 Saeed Jaffrey as Masterji (Guest Appearance)
 Asha Sachdev as the Village Washerwoman
 Sadashiv Amrapurkar as Tolaram
 Vinod Mehra as Ramesh (Lalita's Brother)
 Bharati Achrekar as Ramesh's Wife & Lalita's Sister-In-Law
 Sukanya Kulkarni as Tolaram, Sister In law
 Vikram Gokhale as Chaudhary Lalita's father-in-law (father of her first husband)
Jayshree Gadkar as  Rajeshswari Chaudhary Lalita's mother -in-law (Mother of her first husband)
 Gulshan Grover as Natwarlal
Shama Deshpande as Rani, Housemaid of eeshwar
Rakesh Pandey as  Balkrishna (Balu), as son of Eeshwar
Agha as Tolaram's Father in Law
Shreechand Makhija as Servant of Chaudhary
Birbal as Chandu
 Rasik Dave as son of eeshwar

Soundtrack

Awards
35th Filmfare Awards:

Won

 Best Story – K. Viswanath

Nominated

 Best Actor – Anil Kapoor
 Best Actress – Vijayashanti

References

External links
 

1989 films
Films about autism
1980s Hindi-language films
Films directed by K. Viswanath
Films scored by Laxmikant–Pyarelal
Hindi remakes of Telugu films
1989 romantic drama films
Indian nonlinear narrative films
Indian romantic drama films
Fictional characters with disabilities
Films about widowhood in India